The Wilson Pratt Truss Bridge is a Pratt Truss bridge over the Chapman creek near Chapman, Kansas that was built in 1904. It was listed on the National Register of Historic Places in 2009. It was built by the Canton Bridge Co. and is an excellent example of this type of bridge along with the nearby Chapman Creek Pratt Truss Bridge. It has a wood deck. Due to its location on a dirt road, it has been mostly left alone and does not carry much traffic. It is also denoted as 21-HT-1 and as KSHS Inventory # 041-0000-0169.

References

External links
 

Road bridges on the National Register of Historic Places in Kansas
Bridges completed in 1904
Buildings and structures in Dickinson County, Kansas
National Register of Historic Places in Dickinson County, Kansas
Pratt truss bridges in the United States